Edward Joseph Mason (June 12, 1930 – September 9, 2020) was a Republican State Senator from Maryland's 1st district, which then covered Garrett County and part of Allegany County. Initially elected in November 1970, he served from January 1971 to January 1983. He was the Senate Minority Leader from January 1975 until he left office.

Mason was the 1972 Republican nominee in Maryland's 6th congressional district, losing the general election to incumbent Democrat Goodloe Byron.

Mason left office after losing the 1982 Republican primary to John N. Bambacus who went on to win the general election.

Election results
1970 General Election for Maryland State Senate – District 1
{| class="wikitable"
|-
!Name
!Votes
!Percent
!Outcome
|-
|Edward J. Mason, Rep.
|4,673
|    54%
|   Won
|-
|-
|Ronald C. Brubaker, Dem.
|4,040
|    46%
|
|}

1972 General Election for Maryland's 6th Congressional District
{| class="wikitable"
|-
!Name
!Votes
!Percent
!Outcome
|-
|Goodloe Byron, Dem.
|107,288
|    65%
|   Won
|-
|-
|Edward J. Mason, Rep.
|  58,259
|    35%
|
|}

References

External links
  (includes pictures of two Mason state senate campaign buttons)
  (includes pictures of a Mason congressional campaign button and congressional campaign card)

1930 births
2020 deaths
20th-century American politicians
Republican Party Maryland state senators
Politicians from Cumberland, Maryland
University of Maryland, College Park alumni